Wang Hong (born 22 May 1965) is an archer from the People's Republic of China. She represented China at the  1992 Olympic Games, winning a team silver

References

1965 births
Living people
Archers at the 1992 Summer Olympics
Chinese female archers
Olympic archers of China
Olympic silver medalists for China
Olympic medalists in archery
Medalists at the 1992 Summer Olympics
20th-century Chinese women